Cape Lamas is the southwest point of Seymour Island, Antarctica. The cape was named by the command of the Argentine ship Chiriguano of the Argentine Antarctic Expedition, 1953–54, after Guardiamarina (Midshipman) Lamas, of the Argentine Navy, who died aboard the trawler Fournier off Tierra del Fuego in September 1949.

See also
Fossil Bight

References

Headlands of the James Ross Island group